2007 Zurich Open was a Tier I tennis event on the 2007 WTA Tour.

Justine Henin won her second title here, her first coming in 2003. Tatiana Golovin reached her first Tier I tournament final.

Finals

Singles

 Justine Henin defeated  Tatiana Golovin, 6–4, 6-4

Doubles

 Květa Peschke /  Rennae Stubbs defeated  Lisa Raymond /  Francesca Schiavone, 7–5, 7-6(7–1)

External links
Homepage in English
Draw

Zurich Open
Zurich Open
2007 in Swiss tennis
2007 in Swiss women's sport